There are several rivers named Formoso River in Brazil:

 Formoso River (Bahia)
 Formoso River (Goiás)
 Formoso River (Paraná)
 Formoso River (Rondônia)
 Formoso River (Tocantins)

See also
 Formoso (disambiguation)
 Rio Formoso, Pernambuco, Brazil